Ronald Nigh (born October 29, 1947) is an American ecological anthropologist focusing on Caribbean areas and the Maya region in Mesoamerica. Nigh is a professor and researcher at Centro de Investigaciones y Estudios Superiores en Anthropologia Social (CIESAS), where he continues his research on ecological anthropology.

Early life
Ronald Nigh was born October 29, 1947, in Kearney, Nebraska. Nigh attended Stanford University, where he received his BA in Anthropology in 1969. He continued his education at Stanford and received his MA in Anthropology in 1970 and his Ph.D in Social Anthropology in 1976. Nigh's dissertation was about traditional Maya milpa agriculture in the highlands of Chiapas. He then spent one year at a public research institute continuing his work on traditional Maya agriculture and its relationship to biodiversity and forest regeneration.

Work
From 1985 to 1988, Nigh worked for several environmental NGOs, including The Nature Conservancy and Greenpeace, developing programs in Mexico, where he has spent most of his professional career. Nigh was a part of the team who founded DANA, a nonprofit organization dedicated to promoting sustainable agriculture in Mexico and Central America. Nigh briefly taught at the National Autonomous University of Mexico from 2000 to 2002. Nigh is currently a professor at CIESAS, where he has been conducting anthropological research since 1994.

Nigh's experience with ecological anthropology has allowed him to collaborate with many scholars on research throughout Mesoamerica. His previous works have focused on promoting biodiversity conservation in the midst of rapid human population growth. Most recently, he has collaborated with Dr. Anabel Ford on their book The Maya Forest Garden: Eight Millennia of Sustainable Cultivation of the Tropical Woodlands. Nigh and Ford argue that Maya practices serve as solutions to contemporary problems, such as sustainability, climate change, and natural resource scarcity. Nigh is also now working developing a garden-based science-teaching program in farmer communities in Chiapas.

Notable publications

References

1947 births
Stanford University alumni
American Mesoamericanists
Mesoamerican anthropologists
Mayanists
20th-century Mesoamericanists
Living people
People from Kearney, Nebraska